Viktor Mykolayovych Tikhonov, also spelled Viktor Tykhonov (5 March 1949 – 29 August 2020) was a Ukrainian politician.

Biography
Born in Antratsyt Raion, Tikhonov served in the Verkhovna Rada from 1994 to 2014. He also served as the First Vice Prime Minister of Ukraine from 11 March 2010 until 1 June 2011, with the Cabinet of Prime Minister Mykola Azarov. 

Additionally, Tikhonov was chairman of the Luhansk Regional Council in eastern Ukraine from 1998 to 2006. He also served as the ambassador to Belarus from 2011 to 2012.

In a 2016 interview, Tikhonov stated that he now permanently lived in Russian-occupied Crimea.

Viktor Tikhonov died from pneumonia in Simferopol on 29 August 2020, at the age of 71.

References

1949 births
2020 deaths
People from Luhansk Oblast
First vice prime ministers of Ukraine
First convocation members of the Verkhovna Rada
Fifth convocation members of the Verkhovna Rada
Sixth convocation members of the Verkhovna Rada
Seventh convocation members of the Verkhovna Rada
Party of Regions politicians
Recipients of the Order of Merit (Ukraine), 3rd class
Recipients of the Order of Merit (Ukraine), 2nd class
Recipients of the Order of Merit (Ukraine), 1st class
Ambassadors of Ukraine to Belarus
Recipients of the Honorary Diploma of the Cabinet of Ministers of Ukraine